jPlayer is a free and open-source JavaScript library developed as a jQuery plugin which facilitates the embedding of web based media, notably HTML5 audio and video in addition to Adobe Flash based media.

External links 
 

JavaScript libraries
Computer-related introductions in 2009